The black-chinned fruit dove (Ptilinopus leclancheri), also known as the black-throated fruit dove or Leclancher's dove, is a medium-sized (up to 27 cm long) bird of the family Columbidae. The male is a colorful bird with a green belly and wings, a brown tail, a whitish grey head and neck with a purple base, red iris and a small black patch under its yellow bill. The female has a green head, neck and breast.

The black-chinned fruit dove is distributed in lowland forests of Taiwan and the Philippines, where it is fairly common. On Taiwan, it is very rare, known only from four specimens.

The diet consists mainly of fruits. The female usually lays a single white egg in a nest made of twigs.

Widespread throughout its large range, the black-chinned fruit dove is evaluated as Least Concern on the IUCN Red List of Threatened Species.

References

External links 
 BirdLife Species Factsheet
 Picture of a Black-chinned Fruit Dove

black-chinned fruit dove
Birds of the Philippines
Birds of Taiwan
black-chinned fruit dove
black-chinned fruit dove
Taxobox binomials not recognized by IUCN